The 2016–17 ProA was the 10th season of the ProA, the second level of basketball in Germany. The champions the runners-up of the play-offs are promoted to the 2017–18 Basketball Bundesliga. The season started on September 22, 2016 and ended on May 7, 2017. Mitteldeutscher won the championship and promoted along with runners-up Oettinger Rockets.Vor orangener Wand: MBC krönt sich zum ProA Champion

Table

Play-offs
The quarter-finals and semi-finals were played in a best-of-five play-off format. The Finals are played in a two-legged series in which the team with the most aggregate points wins.

 The two teams that reached the Finals were promoted to the 2017–18 Basketball Bundesliga.

Awards

Monthly Awards

See also
2016–17 Basketball Bundesliga
2016–17 ProB

References

External links
 Official website
 EuroBasket

ProA seasons
Germany
2016–17 in German basketball leagues